Death Steals the Show is a 1950 detective novel by the British writer John Bude.  It is part of his series of novels featuring Superintendent Meredith.

Synopsis
A new musical Old Seville produced by Kurt Goldmayer is having a try-out at a South Coast theatre before transferring to London's West End. One night, however, the leading lady Adrienne Daw disappears from her dressing room and is later found murdered.

References

Bibliography
 Hubin, Allen J. Crime Fiction, 1749-1980: A Comprehensive Bibliography. Garland Publishing, 1984.
 Reilly, John M. Twentieth Century Crime & Mystery Writers. Springer, 2015.
 Sarver, Linda & Markus, Tom. A Novel Approach to Theatre: From Adams to Zola. Scarecrow Press, 1997.

1950 British novels
British mystery novels
British crime novels
Novels by John Bude
Novels set in England
British detective novels